SS Tempest was the first ship of the Anchor Line belonging to Scottish brothers Nicol and Robert Handyside and Captain Thomas Henderson. The , 866-ton ship was built as a sail-ship by Sandeman & McLaurin of Glasgow and launched on 21 December 1854. On 3 April 1855 Henderson began a maiden voyage from Glasgow to Bombay.

The Anchor Line decided to begin transatlantic service between Glasgow and New York City with Tempest. She was converted to a screw steamship with the fitting, by Randolf and Elder, of  engines in 1856. Her first passage left Glasgow on 11 October 1856; sailing from New York on 19 November, she returned to Glasgow after a 28-day crossing.

Her second journey departed Glasgow 27 December, mastered by Capt James Morris, with cargo and 50 passengers. She arrived in New York on 1 February. She sailed eastward on 13 February 1857 with crew, cargo and one passenger aboard. She vanished without a trace. Her fate remains an unsolved mystery to this day along with the 150 people that were on board.

Two other ships of the Anchor Line disappeared at sea; United Kingdom in 1869 and Ismailia in 1873.

References

External links

Missing ships
Ships lost with all hands
1854 ships